"Look Wot You Dun" is a song by the British rock band Slade, released in 1972 as a non-album single. The song was written by lead vocalist Noddy Holder, bassist Jim Lea and drummer Don Powell, and produced by Chas Chandler. It reached No. 4 in the UK, remaining in the charts for ten weeks. The song would be included on the band's 1973 compilation album Sladest.

Background
After achieving their breakthrough hit with "Get Down and Get With It", Slade saw further success with their follow-up single "Coz I Luv You", which topped the UK chart in October 1971. Released as the follow-up single in January 1972, "Look Wot You Dun" continued the band's success, peaking at No. 4 in the UK. The song was the band's second release to feature their trademark misspelling in the song title, following "Coz I Luv You". Upon its release, "Look Wot You Dun" sparked protest from teachers across the UK as it was felt that the phonetic spellings were causing confusion among pupils.

"Look Wot You Dun" was largely written by Lea and Powell. Once the basic idea of the song was formed, Lea took it to Holder who added his contributions. The song is notable for Powell's contribution to some form of backing vocal, providing the heavy breathing heard in the song's chorus. For the recording of the song, Hill borrowed Peter Frampton's guitar as bad weather over the Christmas period meant his guitar did not arrive at the studio as expected.

Release
"Look Wot You Dun" was released on 7" vinyl by Polydor Records in the UK, Ireland, across Europe, Scandinavia, Yugoslavia, South Africa, Australia, New Zealand, Argentina, Brazil, Lebanon and Japan. In America, it was released by Cotillion. The B-side, "Candidate", would appear on the band's 1972 European compilation Coz I Luv You. It was also included on the 2007 compilation B-Sides.

Promotion
Two music videos were filmed to promote the single, both of which were filmed by Caravelle. The first video was filmed at Chessington Zoo in London. A second video was filmed in a studio and featured the group performing the song, with Holder wearing a magician's outfit. In the UK, the band performed the song on the music show Top of the Pops. In Germany, they also performed it on Hits a GoGo.

Critical reception
Upon release, Record Mirror described the song as having a "sturdily staccato sort of theme, right into a commercial 'feel', group vocal, touches of guitar". American magazine Cash Box listed the single as one of their "picks of the week" during February 1972. They felt the "closet-Lennon sound" of the song was "basically a solid programming item on musical merits alone".

Track listing
7" single
 "Look Wot You Dun" - 2:45
 "Candidate" - 2:40

7" single (US promo)
 "Look Wot You Dun" - 2:45
 "Look Wot You Dun" - 2:45

Cover versions
 In 1972, Alan Caddy Orchestra and Singers released an orchestral cover of the song on the album Six Top Hits.
 In 1972, Finnish singer Markku Aro recorded the song under the name "Täyttä Totta" which appeared on the album Oo - Mikä Nainen. Additional writing credit went to Leo Länsi for changed lyrics.
 In 1973, East German rock band Puhdys recorded the song "Geh zu ihr", which was based on "Look Wot You Dun", for the film The Legend of Paul and Paula after director Heiner Carow was unable to secure the rights to the original. The song appeared on the album Puhdys 1.
 In 2001, English vocalist/musician Steve Overland recorded a version of the track for the tribute album Slade Remade.
 In 2014, French Big-Rock band Furious Zoo recorded a version of the song on their seventh album Back to Blues Rock.

Chart performance

Personnel
Slade
Noddy Holder - lead vocals
Dave Hill - lead guitar, backing vocals
Jim Lea - piano, bass, backing vocals
Don Powell - drums

Additional personnel
Chas Chandler - producer

References

1972 singles
Slade songs
Polydor Records singles
Cotillion Records singles
Songs written by Noddy Holder
Songs written by Jim Lea
Song recordings produced by Chas Chandler
1972 songs